Centre on Integrated Rural Development for Asia and the Pacific (CIRDAP) is a Bangladesh-based intergovernmental organization involved in rural development and poverty alleviation. It was established on 6 July 1979 at the initiative of the countries of the Asia-Pacific region and the Food and Agriculture Organization (FAO) of the United Nations with support from several other UN bodies and donors. Initially it had six members countries and has grown to fifteen.

The agency is headquartered in Chameli House, a British Raj-era mansion in front of the Supreme Court of Bangladesh in Dhaka. Present director-general is Thailand's Dr. Cherdsak Virapat.

Members
Afghanistan
Bangladesh (Host State)
India
Indonesia
Iran
Laos
Malaysia
Myanmar
Nepal
Pakistan
Philippines
Sri Lanka
Thailand
Vietnam
Fiji (Joined as 15th member in June 2010)
FAO (Food and Agriculture Organization ) - Member Organization.

Meeting developments

First Ministerial Meeting was held in 1987
Second Ministerial Meeting on Rural Development in Asia and the Pacific was held 24–28 January 2010 in Dhaka

Events

 Regional Cooperation Crucial for Watershed Management, Seminar on CIRDAP's 31st Foundation Day, Dhaka, 6 July 2010.
 Second Ministerial Meeting on Rural Development in Asia and the Pacific, 27–28 January 2010, Dhaka
 Seventeenth Regular Meeting of the CIRDAP Governing Council (GC-17), 25 January 2010, Dhaka
 Twenty-Seventh Regular Meeting of the CIRDAP Executive Committee (EC-27), 24 January 2010, Dhaka
 Fourth Regional Policy Dialogue on Sustainable Rural Livelihoods, 26 January 2010, CIRDAP, Dhaka
 Initiation of the ICT Centre at the CIRDAP International Conference (ICC), 26 January 2010, CIRDAP, Dhaka
 Training-cum-Exposure visit on Micro-Finance in Bangladesh for Indian Officials, 05-12 February 2010 (STST.56), Dhaka
 Twenty Fifth Meeting of CIRDAP Technical Committee (TC-25), 26–29 July 2009, Tehran, Islamic Republic of Iran
 Policy Dialogue on Success Story of Malaysia on Rural Transformation and Poverty Reduction, 27–30, April 2009, Langkawi, Malaysia.
 Ministerial Retreat for Rural Development Ministers of CIRDAP Member Countries

Objective

 To assist national action and promote regional co-operation relating to Integrated Rural Development (IRD), in the region
 To act as a servicing institution for its member states
 To encourage joint collective activities to benefit the member countries both individually and collectively
 To poverty alleviation through people's participation in the development process.

External links
Official site

References

Intergovernmental organizations
Non-profit organisations based in Bangladesh
Development organizations
Organizations established in 1979
Community development organizations